Xu Yinghui (born 7 January 1989) is a Chinese cross-country skier. She competed in the women's 15 kilometre pursuit at the 2006 Winter Olympics.

References

External links
 

1989 births
Living people
Chinese female cross-country skiers
Olympic cross-country skiers of China
Cross-country skiers at the 2006 Winter Olympics
Place of birth missing (living people)
Chinese female biathletes
Asian Games medalists in biathlon
Biathletes at the 2011 Asian Winter Games
Asian Games silver medalists for China
Medalists at the 2011 Asian Winter Games